Poduru is a village and mandal headquarters of Poduru mandal in West Godavari district of the Indian state of Andhra Pradesh.

Etymology
In Telugu, "Podu" means Little forest, as it used to a forest before it was cleared for cultivation.

Geography 
Poduru is located on Eastern coastal plains in Coastal Andhra region.

Demographics 

 Census of India, Poduru had a population of 9578. The total population constitute, 4862 males and 4717 females with a sex ratio of 970 females per 1000 males. 849 children are in the age group of 0–6 years, with sex ratio of 970 The average literacy rate stands at 77.83%.

Notable people
Abraham L. Pudi, father of American actor Danny Pudi, moved to the U.S. from Poduru
Dr.Datla Satyanaraya Raju, better known as D. S. Raju M.B.B.S., L.R.C.P., M.R.C.S., M.R.C.P.(London)[2] (born 28 August 1904) was an Indian Parliamentarian. He was born to Datla Ramachandra Raju in Poduru

References

External links 
 web site

Villages in West Godavari district